Hillpark is a suburb in Auckland, New Zealand. It is bordered by suburbs of The Gardens on the east and Manurewa on the south. It was formerly part of Manukau City until the 2010 amalgamation of all of Auckland's councils, and is now under the governance of Auckland Council.

In 2016 Auckland Council recognised Hillpark as a Special Character Area. The key characteristics of the area include International Style modernist houses, mid-20th century brick and tile bungalows, Arts and Crafts influenced houses, and English Cottage style houses. The area features large open front yards and setbacks, large lots, wide roads, low densities of buildings, and an abundance of trees. Houses were generally constructed from the late 1950s to 1970s following the creation of a garden subdivision around significant stands of native forest. Hillpark suburb is a native sanctuary, which is home to large areas of native forest and parkland including Orford Park, David Park and Hillcrest Grove Reserve. 

In August 2021 The New Zealand Geographic Board Ngā Pou Taunaha o Aotearoa (NZGB) officially assigned Hillpark with an official suburb status. The NZGB followed a Hillpark Residents' Association proposal to make official the suburb name at its meeting in July, 2020. The Association described its unique natural and heritage characteristics which have helped build a suburban identity and which should be recognised.

History 
In 1910, David Laurence Nathan, son of prominent merchant David Nathan, and his wife Simone built their summer residence in Manurewa and named the property ‘The Hill’. In 1961, with the development of the Auckland Southern Motorway, the estate was sold to accommodate residential growth in South Auckland. The land around the Nathan home was developed as the subdivision named "Hillpark Estate", while David Nathan Park and Homestead were held as public assets at the request of the Nathan family.

The first sections of the Hillpark subdivision went on the market on 2 December 1961. The advertisement from South Auckland Courier in 1961 advertised Hillpark as a modern subdivision "developed in accordance with overseas practice in having all underground services, selected street lanterns, spacious proposed neighbourhood shopping area and extensive public reserves". Some houses in Hillpark were designed in the '60s by renowned architect Ron Sang.

The southern motorway extension between Redoubt Road and Takanini was formally opened on 30 May 1963. It included northern on and off ramps at Hill Road.

Area landmarks

The Nathan Homestead 
The Nathan Homestead is a historic mansion built in 1925 and is situated on nine acres of lawn and gardens. This landmark is situated in Hill Rd, Hillpark. The original summer residence of Nathan family was built in 1910 but was destroyed by fire in 1923 and a new permanent residence was rebuilt on the same site in 1925. The former Manukau Borough Council acquired the homestead and surrounding gardens in 1961. It later served as Manukau City Council offices before being restored and reopened as a community and cultural centre in 1978.

Orford Lodge 
The Orford Lodge is situated on 8-10 Earls Court, Hillpark. The house was built in 1910 by a lawyer, Mr Edward Russell. It is listed as Grade II historical and architectural merit. The lodge itself shows the hallmarks of the architecture of its time, strongly influenced by Arts and Crafts architect James Chapman-Taylor. The house and 9ha of land were bought for £12,000 in 1928 by Robert Horace Walpole, 5th Earl of Orford. During the Second World War, the lodge and grounds were used by the US Army. The lodge and land were bought by the Manurewa Borough Council in 1961. The lodge and some of the land was sold but the native bush surrounding the property was designated as a council Orford Park. The house is currently a privately owned residence.

Hillpark Native Forest Remnants 

Mature native forest is now very rare in urban Auckland. Some examples of mature totara, puriri, kahikatea, pukatea, and kanuka forest are found in a cluster of council reserves in Hillpark. These include the Hillcrest Grove Reserve (73 Hill Road, Hillpark), Orford Park (40 Hill Road, Hillpark), and David Nathan Park (68 Hill Road, Hillpark). The Native forest parks of Hillpark along with the nearby Auckland Botanic Gardens are the home of native and introduced birds tūī, rosella, kererū, and ruru.

Demographics

Hillpark had a population of 5,676 at the 2018 New Zealand census, an increase of 660 people (13.2%) since the 2013 census, and an increase of 1,110 people (24.3%) since the 2006 census. There were 1,323 households, comprising 2,856 males and 2,817 females, giving a sex ratio of 1.01 males per female, with 1,173 people (20.7%) aged under 15 years, 1,407 (24.8%) aged 15 to 29, 2,493 (43.9%) aged 30 to 64, and 606 (10.7%) aged 65 or older.

Ethnicities were 46.2% European/Pākehā, 16.6% Māori, 19.5% Pacific peoples, 32.7% Asian, and 2.5% other ethnicities. People may identify with more than one ethnicity.

The percentage of people born overseas was 37.5, compared with 27.1% nationally.

Although some people chose not to answer the census's question about religious affiliation, 29.8% had no religion, 39.7% were Christian, 1.1% had Māori religious beliefs, 8.2% were Hindu, 1.4% were Muslim, 1.6% were Buddhist and 12.6% had other religions.

Of those at least 15 years old, 1,005 (22.3%) people had a bachelor's or higher degree, and 744 (16.5%) people had no formal qualifications. 669 people (14.9%) earned over $70,000 compared to 17.2% nationally. The employment status of those at least 15 was that 2,499 (55.5%) people were employed full-time, 537 (11.9%) were part-time, and 204 (4.5%) were unemployed.

Education

References

Suburbs of Auckland